Jacques Bonjawo (born 30 December 1960 in Yaoundé) is a software engineer, an author and a columnist  in the application of technology to sustainable development.  Jacques is most noted for his work at Microsoft in 1997–2006 as senior program manager for the MSN Group. His early career included also working at PricewaterhouseCoopers as IT manager and senior associate.
He's given a series of talks at various institutions, including Harvard University, the World Bank, and other international forums. His latest book "L'Afrique du XXIe Siècle" (Africa in the 21st Century) is in the list of the 5 best sellers at Karthala, a Paris-based publisher.

while at Microsoft, Mr. Bonjawo was introduced to the African Virtual University (AVU) by its then CEO Cheick Modibo Diarra, and invited to join its board of Directors, following the launch of AVU in Nairobi, Africa, a major distance-learning education institution in Africa that would utilize satellite technology and the Internet to broadcast courses from all over the World to African students. He was elected chairman of board of Directors of the AVU in 2002 and stepped down in 2005.

Published books
 The Internet, a Chance for Africa – 
 L'Afrique du XXIe Siècle (Africa in the 20th Century)
 L'Afrique du XXIe Siècle –

Membership
 Member of the National Press Club (Washington)
 Board Member of the Paris-based Millennium think tank

External links
 Jacques Bonjawo's Bio on Harvard University's Web Site 
 By Jim Krane, the Associated Press
 Jacques Bonjawo's columns in the African Geopolitics magazine
 Jacques Bonjawo's columns in Economie Matin weekly magazine
 Article by Olivier Magnan
 Interview by Patrick Chompre and Caroline Lachowsky
 TV5 Interview by Xavier Lambrechts

1960 births
Microsoft employees
Living people
People from Yaoundé
Cameroonian technology writers
Software engineers
Cameroonian journalists
Cameroonian engineers